

Decade
 As of 2011, Afghanistan maintains its position as the largest source of refugees (a position held for 32 years) with one out of every four refugees being an Afghan and with 95% living in Pakistan or Iran. Refugees are at risk of a variety of health problems, including post-traumatic stress and depression, infectious disease such as tuberculosis and malaria, and consequences of possible torture, rape or trauma.
 From 2010 to 2013, following the 2010 Haiti earthquake, cholera breaks out in Haiti. This outbreak of cholera in Haiti results in more than 7,050 deaths and sickened more than 531,000.

2010
 In February, 2010, in response to the UK General Medical Council investigation and findings of fraud, the editors of The Lancet medical journal fully retracted a paper by Andrew Wakefield that sparked the MMR vaccine controversy. The vaccine-autism connection proposed in a paper has been described as "the most damaging medical hoax of the last 100 years".
 In October, 2010, Sir Robert G. Edwards was awarded the Nobel Prize in Physiology or Medicine for development of in vitro fertilization.

2011

 In October, 2011, Bruce A. Beutler and Jules A. Hoffmann are awarded the Nobel Prize in Physiology or Medicine "for their discoveries concerning the activation of innate immunity" In addition, Ralph M. Steinman was posthumously awarded the prize "for his discovery of the dendritic cell and its role in adaptive immunity".

2012
 On January 13, 2012, India celebrated one year without polio. India had previously been regarded as one of the most difficult countries from which to eliminate polio, due to the high population density and low socioeconomic status in many rural areas. 
 In January, 2012, Schizophrenia was renamed in South Korea from jungshinbunyeolbyung (mind-split disorder), to johyeonbyung (attunement disorder)
 In January, 2012 U.S. pharmaceutical company Gilead Sciences acquires Pharmasset for $11.2 billion, in anticipation of release of the hepatitis C drug sofosbuvir.
 On May 22, 2012, the United States preventive services task force released a guideline advising against routine screening for prostate cancer  using the prostate-specific antigen test, concluding that the benefits of the testing outweighs the harms, and sparking a debate about the use of the test. 
 In July, 2012, GlaxoSmithKline settles a court case with the Department of Justice for $3 billion, the largest pharmaceutical fraud settlement to this date, due to several allegations, including fraudulent of marketing several drugs for off-label uses, the antidepressants Paxil and Wellbutrin, and failure to include data in a Food and Drug Administration submission for the diabetic medication Avandia. 
 In October, 2012, Sir John B. Gurdon and Shinya Yamanaka were awarded the Nobel Prize in Physiology or Medicine for the discovery that mature cells can be reprogrammed to become "pluripotent".
 On October 26, 2012, the National People's Congress of China passed new mental health laws, recognising the increasing awareness of mental health. One of the major changes is the emphasis that treatment must be voluntary in the majority of cases.

2013
 On April 14, 2013, the first kidney grown in a rat in vitro in the U.S. was published. 
 On May 1, 2013, China signed a new mental health law into effect. 
 On May 18, 2013, the psychiatry manual DSM-5 was formally published, revising definitions for a wide range of psychiatric illnesses, including a new definition for autism spectrum disorder and substance use disorder
 On May 29, 2013, results of a phase 3 study for the first vaccine for enterovirus 71, one cause of hand foot mouth disease, were published, showing a 90% statistically significant efficacy  
 On July 3, 2013, a study was published documenting the first human liver grown from stem cells in Japan 
 On October 1, 2013, due to a contentious debate about funding for the Patient Protection and Affordable Care Act the government of the United States entered a period of shutdown, causing 800,000 federal workers to be furloughed. October 1, 2013 was also the first day that many insurance exchanges went online and other sections of the act began to be implemented.
 On October 7, 2013, the Nobel Prize in Physiology or Medicine was awarded to James E. Rothman, Randy W. Schekman, and Thomas C. Südhof for research on cell vesicles.

See also
 Timeline of medicine and medical technology

References

2010s in science
Medicine timelines